Salvador Ballesta Vialcho (born 22 May 1975), commonly known as Salva, is a Spanish former professional footballer who played as a striker, currently a manager.

A goalscorer noted for his flair and workrate, he played for seven top-division clubs, most notably Atlético Madrid, Valencia – with whom he won his sole team trophy – and Málaga. He amassed totals of 235 games and 86 goals over 11 La Liga seasons, adding 126 matches and 52 goals in Segunda División.

Off the field, Salva was known for his nationalistic and militarist viewpoints.

Playing career

Club
Salva was born in Zaragoza, Aragon. After making his professional debut with Sevilla FC, he won the Pichichi Trophy in the 1999–2000 season, scoring 27 goals to lead La Liga's scoring charts for Racing de Santander. He then moved to Segunda División with Atlético Madrid (recently relegated) and proceeded to lead the side with 21 goals, although the Colchoneros did not return to the top flight.

Salva joined Valencia CF in summer 2001, netting five goals to help the club become league champions after a 31-year drought. He was rarely used the following season, and was subsequently briefly part of the Bolton Wanderers squad that avoided Premier League relegation in 2003. He had another two loan stints from 2003 to 2005, with Málaga CF for which he scored 21 competitive goals, including a hat-trick in a 5–1 league home crushing of FC Barcelona on 3 December 2003, and Atlético Madrid, being subsequently released and signing with the former.

In late January 2007, Salva joined top-tier strugglers Levante UD on loan from Málaga, now in the second division. On 4 February, he played his first league match for them in an away win against Real Madrid, scoring the game's only goal. After the season's end, with the Valencians managing to retain their status, he returned to Málaga, and netted seven times to help to promotion.

As he spent most of 2008–09 hampered by recurrent injuries, Salva was still able to contribute, notably coming from the bench against neighbours UD Almería and helping turn the score from 0–2 to a 3–2 home win with two goals, on 8 February 2009. On 15 March, he added another brace against another neighbouring club, in a 2–2 home draw with former side Sevilla. He was released after his contract expired.

In the dying hours of the 2009 August transfer window, Salva signed a 1+1 deal with Albacete Balompié, aged 34. At the end of his first season, where he appeared almost exclusively as a backup, he was one of 14 players who were not offered an extension, being released and retiring shortly after.

International
Salva played four matches with Spain, the first being a friendly against Poland on 26 January 2000, coming in for Ismael Urzaiz in the 70th minute of an eventual 3–0 win in Cartagena.

Coaching career
Shortly after retiring, Salva re-joined former team Málaga as a youth coach, alongside former teammate Francesc Arnau. On 11 July 2013, he was appointed as the new manager of Málaga's reserves Atlético Malagueño, in Tercera División. He left two years later, as his contract was not renewed.

Salva continued working in the lower leagues the following seasons, with Real Jaén, CD Móstoles URJC, Algeciras CF, UCAM Murcia CF and San Fernando CD.

Personal life
Off the pitch, Salva was notorious for his outspoken personality and his political beliefs, far to the right of most of his peers'. A nationalist who put his love for the "fatherland" over that for his own family, he displayed the nation's flag on his boots; when sent off for Málaga against CA Osasuna, whose fans include supporters of Basque independence, he shouted to them  "¡Que viva España, hijos de puta!" (Long live Spain, sons of bitches!). Fans of Basque team Real Sociedad displayed a banner reading "Salva, muérete" (Salva, die) when he visited their Anoeta Stadium, and he also had a dislike for Barcelona defender Oleguer Presas, an outspoken left-winger and proponent of Catalan independence, saying that he had more respect for "dog crap" than for him.

Although his footballing idol was Real Madrid's Hugo Sánchez, Salva's other heroes included Francoist fighter pilot Joaquín García Morato, Luftwaffe aviator Hans-Ulrich Rudel and Antonio Tejero, leader of the failed "23-F" right-wing coup. A self-declared Christian, he considered himself apolitical.

Born to a family with a military background, Salva stated that he would be the first to serve in the Iraq War if conscripted by prime minister José María Aznar. He was a patron of his hometown's military helicopter school.

In February 2013, Salva learnt that he was being turned down for the assistant coach job at RC Celta de Vigo over his political views.

Managerial statistics

Honours
Valencia
La Liga: 2001–02

Spain U21
UEFA European Under-21 Championship: 1998

Individual
Pichichi Trophy: 1999–2000
Pichichi Trophy (Segunda División): 2000–01

References

External links

CiberChe biography and stats 

1975 births
Living people
Spanish Christians
Spanish footballers
Footballers from Zaragoza
Association football forwards
La Liga players
Segunda División players
Segunda División B players
Sevilla Atlético players
Sevilla FC players
Écija Balompié players
Racing de Santander players
Atlético Madrid footballers
Valencia CF players
Málaga CF players
Levante UD footballers
Albacete Balompié players
Premier League players
Bolton Wanderers F.C. players
Pichichi Trophy winners
Spain under-21 international footballers
Spain under-23 international footballers
Spain international footballers
Spanish expatriate footballers
Expatriate footballers in England
Spanish expatriate sportspeople in England
Spanish football managers
Segunda División B managers
Tercera División managers
Primera Federación managers
Real Jaén managers
Algeciras CF managers
UCAM Murcia CF managers